Vitreolina antiflexa is a species of sea snail, a marine gastropod mollusk in the family Eulimidae. The species is one of a number within the genus Eulima.

Distribution
This species occurs ion the North Atlantic Ocean and in the Mediterranean Sea off Greece.

References

 Monterosato T. A. (di) (1884). Nomenclatura generica e specifica di alcune conchiglie mediterranee. Palermo, Virzi, 152 pp

External links
 World Register of Marine Species

antiflexa
Gastropods described in 1884